Mika Miles Biereth (born 8 February 2003) is a Danish professional footballer who plays as a forward for Eredivisie club RKC Waalwijk, on loan from  club Arsenal.

Early life
Biereth was born in London. He developed through Fulham's youth ranks. He finished the 2020–21 season as the top scorer in the Under-18 Premier League South, with 21 goals and 13 assists.

Club career

Arsenal
Biereth joined Premier League side Arsenal and signed his first professional contract on 30 July 2021. He scored three goals in a 6–1 away win over Chelsea Under-23s at Kingsmeadow in the Premier League 2 on 19 September 2021, sealing his first hat-trick for Arsenal Under-23s. In May 2022, following a string of impressive performances, Biereth was one of eight players to be nominated for the Premier League 2's Player of the Month Award for April, though it was eventually awarded to West Ham United's Sonny Perkins.

Biereth appeared four times as an unused substitute for Arsenal's first team during the 2021–22 season: in the FA Cup third round match away to Nottingham Forest at City Ground on 9 January, in the two legs of the EFL Cup semi-finals against Liverpool at Anfield on 13 January and at Emirates Stadium on 20 January, and in the game of the 23rd round of Premier League at Emirates Stadium against Burnley on 23 January.

Loan to RKC Waalwijk
Biereth joined Eredivisie club RKC Waalwijk on a season-long loan on 23 June 2022. On 17 September 2022, he made his competitive debut for the club in a 5–1 home victory over SC Cambuur in the domestic league. On 7 October, he scored his first and second competitive goals as a substitute in a 3–2 win over Groningen at Euroborg in the league, helping the team record the first away victory of the season.

International career
Born in England, Biereth is of Danish descent through his father, although the Danish coach incorrectly attributes this to his mother. He represented Denmark at under-19 level. He was first called up by Denmark U19 in September 2021, and made his debut for the team in a 2–0 away win over Northern Ireland U19 on 6 October 2021.

Style of play
Biereth has been described as a robust player, possessing an all-round skillset & a knack of scoring goals. His style of play, especially his aggression & defensive contribution has been likened to Jamie Vardy. Like Vardy, he is most comfortable as a classic "number 9", or secondarily on the wing. During his time at Arsenal's Hale End academy, he developed his general & tactical play.

Media
Biereth was involved in the Amazon Original sports docuseries All or Nothing: Arsenal, which documented the club by spending time with the coaching staff and players behind the scenes both on and off the field throughout their 2021–22 season.

Career statistics

References

External links
 
 

2003 births
Living people
Footballers from Greater London
Danish people of English descent
English people of Danish descent
Danish men's footballers
Denmark youth international footballers
English footballers
Association football forwards
Fulham F.C. players
Arsenal F.C. players
RKC Waalwijk players
Danish expatriate men's footballers
Danish expatriate sportspeople in the Netherlands
English expatriate footballers
English expatriate sportspeople in the Netherlands
Expatriate footballers in the Netherlands